Moacir Vieira de Araújo Júnior (born 15 February 1967), known as Moacir Júnior, is a Brazilian football manager and former player who played as a central defender. He is the current manager of Aparecidense.

Honours 
Estrela do Norte
Copa Espírito Santo: 2005

Tupi
Campeonato Mineiro Módulo II: 2007

América de Natal 
Campeonato Potiguar: 2019

Treze
Campeonato Paraibano: 2020

References

1967 births
Living people
Sportspeople from Minas Gerais
Brazilian footballers
Association football defenders
Brazilian football managers
Campeonato Brasileiro Série B managers
Campeonato Brasileiro Série C managers
Campeonato Brasileiro Série D managers
Ipatinga Futebol Clube managers
Comercial Futebol Clube (Ribeirão Preto) managers
Tupi Football Club managers
Paulista Futebol Clube managers
Villa Nova Atlético Clube managers
Uberlândia Esporte Clube managers
Oeste Futebol Clube managers
Tombense Futebol Clube managers
América Futebol Clube (MG) managers
ABC Futebol Clube managers
Clube Náutico Capibaribe managers
Criciúma Esporte Clube managers
Boa Esporte Clube managers
Clube Atlético Linense managers
Botafogo Futebol Clube (SP) managers
Cuiabá Esporte Clube managers
Volta Redonda Futebol Clube managers
América Futebol Clube (RN) managers
Associação Portuguesa de Desportos managers
Associação Atlética Aparecidense managers